"This Ain't a Love Song" is a song by British band Scouting for Girls. It is the first track and single from their second studio album, Everybody Wants to Be on TV. The song premiered on the Scott Mills BBC Radio 1 show on 15 January 2010. Its artwork was released on the band's website on 8 February and its video premiered on the band's website on 18 February. The song itself was released for digital download on 26 March 2010 with a CD release following three days later.

Chart performance
"This Ain't a Love Song" debuted at number one on the UK Singles Chart on 4 April 2010—for the week ending dated 10 April 2010—marking the band's most successful single to date, and their first number-one single. The single remained at the top position for two consecutive weeks before falling to number two in favour of Usher and will.i.am's'"OMG". After spending five weeks within the top 10, the single fell to number 11. "This Ain't a Love Song" spent a total of ten weeks within the top 40 and 22 weeks within the Top 100. In Scotland, the song spent three weeks at number one—keeping "OMG" off the top spot—then fell to number five on 25 April. In the Republic of Ireland, "This Ain't a Love Song" debuted in the Irish Singles Chart at number 34, later climbing to number four, marking the band's only top five hit there. The single debuted on the Australian Singles Chart on 24 May 2010 at number 36, peaking at number 19.

Music video
The video for "This Ain't a Love Song" was filmed at London City Airport and a technical college in Rainham, Essex, and was directed by Eric Liss. The idea for the video came from the lead singer, Roy Stride. The original video was dismissed as being too dark so the version that was released was filmed. These shots included a girl waiting for her flight crew mother, two male friends and an old couple. The video also involved several night shots.

Track listing
European CD single
 "This Ain't a Love Song" (radio edit)
 "Gotta Keep Smiling"

Personnel
Performance credits
 Vocals: Roy Stride, Greg Churchouse
 Bass: Greg Churchouse
 Percussion: Pete Ellard
 Piano: Roy Stride
 Guitar: Roy Stride

Technical credits
 Production: Andy Green

Charts and certifications

Weekly charts

Year-end charts

Certifications

Release history

See also
 List of number-one singles from the 2010s (UK)

References

External links
 Music Video at YouTube
 Lyrics at scoutingforgirls.com
 
 Scouting for Girls official YouTube channel

2010 singles
2010 songs
Epic Records singles
Number-one singles in Scotland
Scouting for Girls songs
Songs written by Roy Stride
UK Singles Chart number-one singles